Pipe drift is a measure of the roundness or eccentricity of the inside wall of a pipe.  "API drift" refers to primary specifications set forth in API Specification 5CT (ISO 11960), "Specification for Casing and Tubing".  "Alternate drift" refers to alternate drift specifications listed in API 5CT.  "Special drift" refers to industry drift specifications other than those found in API 5CT.

Drifting means measuring a pipe's inner roundness.  Drifting is typically performed by passing a cylindrical mandrel through the length of the pipe to detect occlusions.  It occurs both at the pipe mill and in the field.  Drifting is performed to ensure that tools, pumps, smaller pipe, and other items can be passed through the pipe.

Pigging
Piping
Oilfield terminology
Oil industry standards